Kibong'oto Infectious Disease Hospital is a specialty 340-bed hospital in Kilimanjaro Region, Tanzania. It serves as the country's infectious disease hospital, treating Multi-drug-resistant tuberculosis as well as offering general hospital services to the population of the district.

The hospital was founded by a British physician Dr. Normal Davies in 1926, initially as a tuberculosis sanitorium, then designated as the regional tuberculosis hospital for East Africa. Over many decades the hospital has expanded its services and is now the leading hospital for infectious disease care in the country.  In 2020 the hospital began construction of a viral infections laboratory that is expected to have a substantial impact on the hospitals ability to monitor and treat infectious diseases.

References

Hospitals in Tanzania
Infectious diseases
Tuberculosis